Alexandria in Arachosia also known as Alexandropolis (Ἀλεξανδρόπολις) was a city in ancient times that is now called Kandahar in Afghanistan. It was one of more than twenty cities founded or renamed by Alexander the Great. It was founded around 330 BCE, on the foundations of an earlier Achaemenid fortress. Arachosia is the Greek name of an ancient province of the Achaemenid, Seleucid and Parthian empires. The province of Arachosia was centered around the Argandab valley in Kandahar. It did not reach the Hindu Kush, but it apparently extended east as far as the Indus River, although its exact extents are not yet clear.

History

After the conquests of Alexander the Great, Arachosia was ruled by the Satrap Sybirtius. In the 3rd century BCE, it is thought that the ambassador to the Indian court Megasthenes departed from the city to visit India:
Megasthenes lived with Sibyrtius, satrap of Arachosia, and often speaks of his visiting Sandracottus, the king of the Indians. Arrian, Anabasis Alexandri

Isidorus of Charax in his 1st century CE "Parthian stations" itinerary described an "Alexandropolis, the metropolis of Arachosia", which he said was still Greek even at such a late time:

Remains

The remains of Alexandria in Arachosia are today found in the tell of Old Kandahar citadel in the western portion of the modern city. The citadel tell was excavated by the British Society for South Asian Studies through the 1970s and with the relative improvement in security from 2008 to 2009.

These excavations indicate that the Islamic walls were based on those from classical times, indicating what might be a square (tetragonis) shaped town, but one highly modified by the unusual topography. A triangular-shaped portion of the tell adjoining the Greek town is from the Buddhist era.

Alexander appears to have founded his town on the site of a 6th-century BCE Persian garrison point. The pass, river and junction of three long-distance trade routes made the location of strategic importance. To date, no Greek buildings have been found, but numerous coins, inscriptions and graves have been. Further discoveries are anticipated as excavation reaches deeper strata of the tell.

The citadel walls have been shown to have contained circular towers similar to those at Farah, Balkh and Nadi Ali Sorkh Gdagh, although these could be Islamic in age.

Gallery

See also 
 Kandahar
 Old Kandahar
List of cities founded by Alexander the Great

References

External links

 
 

Cities founded by Alexander the Great
History of Kandahar
Populated places established in the 4th century BC
330s BC establishments
Bactrian and Indian Hellenistic period
Former populated places in Afghanistan
Populated places along the Silk Road
Cities in Central Asia
Hellenistic sites in Afghanistan